is a Japanese voice actor and singer.  He was represented by Atomic Monkey and is now a freelancer. His major roles are Josuke Higashikata in JoJo's Bizarre Adventure: Diamond Is Unbreakable, Taiga Kagami in Kuroko's Basketball, Zenkichi Hitoyoshi in Medaka Box, Kaname Tsukahara in Kimi to Boku, Masayuki Hori in Monthly Girls' Nozaki-kun, Jun Isashiki in Ace of Diamond and Ultraman Belial in the recurring Ultraman Series.

Biography
During his high school years, Ono aimed to become a professional soccer player and at one point was scouted by the Shimizu S-Pulse. Unfortunately, he stopped playing in the third year as a result of bone fracture.

During his years in university, Ono becomes a fan of Kishō Taniyama. In addition to meeting the voice actor in person at an anime event, this inspired him to pursue the same career.

In August 2011, Ono forms the voice acting unit  alongside voice actor Takuya Eguchi. The two had also worked on various Drama CD productions and events.

In March 2013, he was awarded for "best actors in supporting roles" in the 7th Seiyu Awards.

On October 2, 2017, Ono announced his marriage from the last seven years prior in his blog post. His wife is a person working outside the entertainment industry. In August 2020, Ono announced the birth of his first child.

Ono revealed on NHK that his father is also an NHK announcer and hence, under his father's influence, he wanted to try to take more narration works in the future.

Filmography

Anime

Original video animation (OVA)

Original net animation (ONA)

Film

Tokusatsu

Video games

{| class="wikitable sortable plainrowheaders"
|+ List of voice performances in video games
! Year
! Title
! Role
! class="unsortable"| Notes
! class="unsortable"| Source
|-
|  ||  || Computer lab member || PSP || 
|-
|  || Akai Ito Destiny DS || Tomoki || DS || 
|-
| –11 || Yu-Gi-Oh 5D's games || Kyosuke Kiryu || PSP || 
|-
| –13 || Starry Sky games || Shogo Kuchi || || 
|-
|  ||  || Goa || PSP || 
|-
|  ||  || Ryo Kurosaki, Carl || PC || 
|-
|  ||  || Tutorial for Kowloons九龍院要 || DS || 
|-
|  ||  || Palace Toa坎宮トア||PC || 
|-
|  || Conception: Ore no Kodomo o Undekure! || Itsuki Yuge || Main player character, PSP || 
|-
| –15 || Kuroko's Basketball games || Taiga Kagami || PSP || 
|-
|  || Mobile Suit Gundam AGE || Jonathan Gustav || Universe Axel and Cosmic DrivePSP ||  
|-
|  || Kokoro Connect || Shingo Watase || PSP || 
|-
|  || English Detective Mysteria || Porrock || PSP || 
|-
|  ||  || Lancelot || PSP || 
|-
|  || Summon Night 5 || Caris カリス || PSP || 
|-
|  ||  || Luke · Fernando · Javier陸・フェルナンド・ハビエル || PSP, also V || 
|-
|  ||  || William Shakespeare || PSP || 
|-
|  ||  || Omoto Sanmono山王堂王子|| PSP || 
|-
|  || Fairy Fencer F || Souji || PS3 || 
|-
|  || Exstetra || Jin || DS, PS Vita || 
|-
|  || Arcana Famiglia 2 || Serafino || PSP || 
|-
|  ||  || Aje || PSP || 
|-
|  ||  || Utano Association宇多野准 || PSP || 
|-
|  ||  ||Yuri Kaiseki由利鎌清||PSP || 
|-
|  || Of the Red, the Light, and the Ayakashi ||Pure眞白||PSP || 
|-
|  ||  ||Inuyama Naga犬村大角||PSP, also Hamaji Himeyuki || 
|-
|  ||  || William Shakespeare || PSPAlso Volume pack in 2015 || 
|-
|  ||  ||Maxiusマキシウス || || 
|-
|  ||  ||Eliasエリアス || || 
|-
|  ||  || Karu Igarashi五十嵐馨 || PSP, other || 
|-
|  || ||Ryuji Rokkai六合龍二 || || 
|-
|  ||  || Hameln || || 
|-
|  ||  ||Ninety-nine九十九丸 || || 
|-
|  ||  ||Tiger (Ogami Tiger Maru)トラ（大神虎丸）||PC, PS3 || 
|-
|  ||  ||Su蘇明杰 || || 
|-
|  ||  ||Masaru Igarashi五十嵐将 || || 
|-
|  ||  || Yuri Kamakiyo || || 
|-
|  || Prince of Stride || Asuma Mayuzumi || || 
|-
|  ||  ||Luneリューン || || 
|-
|  || Arslan: The Warriors of Legend || Jaswant || PS3, other || 
|-
|  || Tokyo Mirage Sessions ♯FE || Touma Akagi || || 
|-
|  || British Detective Mysteria The Crown || Moriarty Jr. || || 
|-
|  ||  || Yakumo八雲 || PS3, other || 
|-
|  || Collar × Malice || Saeki Yuzuru冴木弓弦 || || 
|-
|  ||  || Mamoru Uekie上樹守人||PC || 
|-
|  || Magic-kyun Renaissance || Rintarō Tatewaki || || 
|-
|  ||  || Tsuzuramaru 九十九丸 || || 
|-
|  || Digimon Story: Cyber Sleuth – Hacker's Memory || Chitose Imai || PS4, PS Vita || 
|-
|  || Mr Love: Queen's Choice || Gavin / Baiqi / Haku || iOS, Android ||
|-
|  || The King of Fighters for Girls || K' || Android, iOS || 
|-
|  || JoJo's Bizarre Adventure: Last Survivor || Josuke Higashikata || Arcade || 
|-
|  || Bleach: Brave Souls || Bazz-B || iOS, Android ||
|-
|2020
|Granblue Fantasy Versus
|Gran, Lancelot
|PS4, PC (Steam)
|
|-
|2020
|Arknights|Sesa
|iOS, Android
|
|-
|2021
|Guardian Tales|The Guardian Knight (Male. Japanese, Chinese and Nintendo Switch servers only), The Impostor Knight (Male)
|iOS, Android, Nintendo Switch
|
|-
|2021
|Angelique Luminarise|Cyrus/Silas
|Nintendo Switch
|
|-
|2021
|Cookie Run: Kingdom|Eclair Cookie
|Android, iOS
|
|-
|2021
|Slow Damage|Towa
トワ
|PC (Adult Only)
|
|-
|2022
|JoJo's Bizarre Adventure: All Star Battle R|Josuke Higashikata
|PS4, PS5, Xbox One, Xbox Series X/S, Nintendo Switch, PC
|
|-
|  || Cardfight!! Vanguard Dear Days || Danji Momoyama || Nintendo Switch, PC || 
|}

Drama CD

BL CD Drama
 10Dance – Suzuki Shinya
 Akihabara Fall in Love – Yuuki Hasegawa
 Don't Stay Gold – Kuga
 Hatsukoi no Atosaki – Nishima Tooru
 Iberiko Buta to Koi to Tsubaki – Yoshimune
 Saezuru Tori wa Habatakanai – Kuga
 Shinjo-kun to Sasahara-kun – Sasahara
 Hana no Mizo Shiru – Arikawa Youichi
 Yatamomo – Yata
 Renai-rubi no Tadashii Furikata – Hayashida Kannosuke
 Megumi to Tsugumi - Kokonoe Megumi
 The Demon Prince of Momochi House (2014) (Ise)
 The Demon Prince of Momochi House Part 2 (2015) (Ise)
 The Demon Prince of Momochi House Part 3 (2015) (Ise)

Radio drama
 Kuroko's Basketball – Taiga Kagami
 Samurai Shodown: Warriors Rage – Tohma Kuki
 A Terrified Teacher at Ghoul School'' - Izuna Hatanaka

Dubbing

References

External links 

  
 Yūki Ono at Lantis 
 

1984 births
Living people
Japanese male pop singers
Japanese male video game actors
Japanese male voice actors
Lantis (company) artists
Male voice actors from Shizuoka Prefecture
Musicians from Shizuoka Prefecture
Waseda University alumni
21st-century Japanese male actors
21st-century Japanese singers
21st-century Japanese male singers